Zari David "Bebo" Kovo (a.k.a. Kobo; born February 1951) is an Israeli-Bulgarian property developer, the co-founder of property company Camden Market Holdings & Developments (including Stanley Sidings and the Stables Market Property Group), with nearly $880 million in assets as of 2014. Camden Market Holdings owns, operates, and manages real estate properties mainly in Camden Town, London, England. Properties include Camden Market, Stables Market, Camden Lock Market and Developments, recognized as the second largest tourist attraction in Europe with over 40 million annual visitors.

In 2014, a majority portion of the company's assets were acquired for $680 million by Lab Tech Holdings.

Career
In the 1970s, Kobo was based in Hong Kong, as a clothing manufacturer, working closely with the Nakash Group, who owned the fashion brand Jordache. In the 1990s, Kobo expanded into real estate development in Florida by acquiring several buildings on Miami's famed Ocean Drive and developing the Opa-Locka Flea Market prior to its sale of $80 million.

In the 1990s, Kobo alongside Richard Caring, and Elliott Bernerd, head of the British property company Chelsfield, teamed up to acquire London's Camden Market as well other properties in Camden Town. In 2014, they sold "a huge swathe" to fellow Israeli, the gambling billionaire Teddy Sagi, for £440 million. The transaction was handled by PIR Equities, which is the private equity arm of Kobo's eldest son O.D. Kobo.

By 2008, Kobo along with his eldest son businessman OD Kobo were the largest single property holders in the Camden area, with 9 acres of freehold property.

Personal life
Kobo was convicted in 1979 of raping a woman who was a passenger in his car, and was sentenced to 18 months in prison. 

He is the father of businessman Oded David Kobo, and has five other children.

He is married to Israeli model Miri Bohadana.

In 2015, he bought a 960 sq m house in Arsuf, an "exclusive cliff-top community", for NIS 106 million, as part of a creditors' arrangement for brothers Eliyahu and Moshe Shushan and brothers Gad and Dov Slook.

References

External links
 

Israeli businesspeople
Living people
1951 births
Israeli chief executives
Israeli people convicted of rape